Triethoxysilane is an organosilicon compound with the formula HSi(OC2H5)3.  It is a colourless liquid used in precious metal-catalysed hydrosilylation reactions.  The resulting triethoxysilyl groups are often valued for attachment to silica surfaces.  Compared to most compounds with Si-H bonds, triethoxysilane exhibits relatively low reactivity.  Like most silyl ethers, triethoxysilane is susceptible to hydrolysis.
As reducing agent, triethoxysilane can for example be used in reduction of amides, reduction of carbonyl compounds in the presence of cobalt(II) chloride as catalyst, Cu-catalyzed reductive hydroxymethylation of styrenes, and Rh-catalyzed hydrodediazoniation.

References

Silyl ethers